Dance Factory is a children's television show which ran for nine weeks from March to May 2005 at 10.30am on BBC One. It was simulcast on the CBBC Channel. It is hosted by Reggie Yates, with co-presenters Camilla Dallerup and Nigel Clarke.

The aim of the show is to pair six non-dancers with experts their own age in Bhangra, Irish dancing, pop, tap dancing, hip hop and musical theatre styles. The contestants are drawn from all over the UK, and auditions were held in London, Manchester, Birmingham, Cardiff, Glasgow and Belfast.

The next phase of the show sees the experts teaching their new partners how to dance, and also saw them meeting some showbiz stars to pick up tips along the way. These included Michael Flatley, of Riverdance fame; Rio Ferdinand, the England and Manchester United star; Denise Lewis, Olympic gold medallist (also seen in Strictly Come Dancing) and the cast of Chitty Chitty Bang Bang in London's West End.

After six weeks of intense training and rehearsal, the contestants are thrust into live semi-finals, each of which saw one pair eliminated from the competition by CBBC viewers. The musical theatre pair of Stacey and Josh were eliminated first, followed by Teejay and Tom, the Bhangra pair, the week after.

In a specially-extended final, the Irish dancing pair of Claire and Gavin went away with the title of Dance Factory Champions and won a dream trip to New York City.  The runners up were Naoimh and her partner, dancing tap.

External links 
 
 

2005 British television series debuts
2005 British television series endings
2000s British children's television series
BBC children's television shows
British reality television series
English-language television shows